The Sign of the Rose is a 1922 American silent drama film directed by Harry Garson and starring George Beban, Jeanne Carpenter and Charles Edler.

Cast
 Helene Sullivan as Lillian Griswold
 Charles Edler as 	William Griswold
 Jeanne Carpenter as 	Dorothy Griswold
 Gene Cameron as Philip Griswold
 Louise Calmenti as 	Rosa
 Stanhope Wheatcroft as 	Cecil Robbins
 Arthur Thalasso as 	Detective Lynch
 George Beban as Pietro Balletti
 Dorothy Giraci as 	Rosina Balletti
 M. Solomon	as 	Moses Erbstein

References

Bibliography
 Connelly, Robert B. The Silents: Silent Feature Films, 1910-36, Volume 40, Issue 2. December Press, 1998.
 Munden, Kenneth White. The American Film Institute Catalog of Motion Pictures Produced in the United States, Part 1. University of California Press, 1997.

External links
 

1922 films
1922 drama films
1920s English-language films
American silent feature films
Silent American drama films
American black-and-white films
Films directed by Harry Garson
1920s American films
English-language drama films